Andrey Vladimirovich Savenkov (born March 7, 1975) is a Kazakhstani ice hockey player who was a member of the Kazakhstan men's national ice hockey team at the 2006 Winter Olympics and as well as the 1998 Winter Olympics.

Career statistics

Regular season and playoffs

RUS.2 totals do not include numbers from the 1994–95 season.

International

References

1975 births
Living people
Barys Nur-Sultan players
Olympic ice hockey players of Kazakhstan
Ice hockey players at the 1998 Winter Olympics
Ice hockey players at the 2006 Winter Olympics
Asian Games gold medalists for Kazakhstan
Asian Games silver medalists for Kazakhstan
Medalists at the 1996 Asian Winter Games
Medalists at the 2003 Asian Winter Games
Medalists at the 2007 Asian Winter Games
Ice hockey players at the 1996 Asian Winter Games
Ice hockey players at the 2003 Asian Winter Games
Ice hockey players at the 2007 Asian Winter Games
Asian Games medalists in ice hockey